Zeki Levent Kırca (September 28, 1950 – October 12, 2015) was a Turkish comedian, stage and film actor, columnist of the  newspaper Aydınlık and politician of the left-wing Patriotic Party.

Kırca was born in Samsun on September 28, 1950. Kırca was a faculty member at Beykent University, Faculty of Fine Arts. He was named a State Artist in 1998, following a suggestion put forward by the 55th government of Turkey, however, the title was taken back by the 63rd government. He died of liver cancer in Istanbul on October 12, 2015. Following the religious funeral service at Levent Mosque, he was interred in the Zincirlikuyu Cemetery.

References

External links

1950 births
2015 deaths
Deaths from cancer in Turkey
Deaths from liver cancer
Burials at Zincirlikuyu Cemetery
Kemalists
Patriotic Party (Turkey) politicians
People from Samsun
Turkish comedians
Turkish male stage actors
Turkish male film actors
State Artists of Turkey
Turkish actor-politicians
Turkish columnists
Workers' Party (Turkey) politicians